This is a list of released and upcoming video games that are developed in Slovakia. The list is sorted by game title, platform, year of release and their developer. This list does not include serious games.

References

External links 
Database of Czech and Slovak video games
Czech and Slovak video game database
List of commercial Czech and Slovak PC Games with added information
Slovak Game Developers Association website (The Activities page and Industry Reports page with Statistics are useful for creating/editing a Wiki page about the Slovak game market & companies. Start that one & end updating this page.) 

Slovakia
Slovakia-related lists